William Hardie may refer to:

 William Hardie (1862–1916), Scottish classical scholar
 W. F. R. Hardie (1902–1990), Scottish classical scholar (son of the above)
 William Hardie (archbishop of the West Indies) (1878–1950)
 William Hardie (bishop of Ballarat) (1904–1980)

See also
 William Hardy (disambiguation)